Kim López González (born 4 January 1989) is a Spanish para-track and field athlete who competed at the 2016 Summer Paralympics in the T12/F12 shot put. He won a gold medal in the shot put with a personal best distance of 16.44 metres. He won a gold medal in the 2020 Summer Paralympics in the F12 shot put establishing a new World record.

Footnotes

1989 births
Living people
Sportspeople from Valencia
Spanish male shot putters
Spanish male discus throwers
Paralympic athletes of Spain
Athletes (track and field) at the 2016 Summer Paralympics
Athletes (track and field) at the 2020 Summer Paralympics
Medalists at the 2016 Summer Paralympics
Medalists at the 2020 Summer Paralympics
Paralympic gold medalists in athletics (track and field)
Medalists at the World Para Athletics Championships
World Para Athletics Championships winners
Medalists at the World Para Athletics European Championships
Visually impaired shot putters
Visually impaired discus throwers
Paralympic shot putters
Paralympic discus throwers